Qaleh Khaki (also Romanized as Qal‘eh Khākī and Ghal’eh Khaki) is a village in Harirud Rural District, Bujgan District, Torbat-e Jam County, Razavi Khorasan Province, Iran. At the 2006 census, its population was 114, in 21 families.

References 

Populated places in Torbat-e Jam County